Kendall Grove is an unincorporated community in Northampton County, Virginia, United States. The community is located along U.S. Route 13 north of Eastville, Virginia.

References
GNIS reference

Unincorporated communities in Virginia
Unincorporated communities in Northampton County, Virginia